The Empress Theatre has stood for 100 years. Built in 1916 by the Western Theatre Corporation at the end of historic Main Street in Magna, UT, the venue originally opened to provide entertainment to the mine workers.

Historical significance 
The design of the building, a combination of Neo-classical and Beaux Arts styles, makes it the most outstanding example of high style architecture in Magna. Though not a premier example of the Neo-classical style in Utah, the Empress Theatre is one of a number of distinctively styled theatres in small Utah towns that are dominated by relatively plain commercial buildings.

Historically, the Empress Theatre is one of the oldest and best preserved commercial buildings in Magna, and it is the oldest theatre in the community. At the time of its construction, the Empress Theatre was the second theatre in Magna. The other theatre, the Palace Theatre, operated from 1914–17, but its location is currently unknown. The Empress Theatre was constructed during the period of greatest growth in Magna, the 1910s-20s. The Utah Copper Corporation was established in 1903, incorporating numerous small mining operations into one large one, and soon after erected the Magna and Arthur concentrators near the site of Pleasant Green, which several years later became known as Magna.

The Empress Theatre was one of a number of buildings that were erected along Main Street during the decades of the 1910s and '20s, creating a substantial commercial district. Most of those buildings have been left vacant and neglected over the past 50 years, however, as the prime commercial district has shifted further west and south and the depressed local economy has dried up most businesses in the old Main Street area. The Empress Theatre is one of the best preserved of the older commercial buildings along Main Street, and it is easily the most sophisticated in terms of its architectural design. Most of the remaining buildings in the area are relatively plain, nondescript commercial buildings.

On May 9, 1985, the theatre was entered into the National Charter for Historic Places (National Register #85000962). Making it the only building in Magna to hold the distinction.

Theatre operations 
Day-to-day operations are fulfilled by a group of more than 300 volunteers from around the Salt Lake Valley. In addition to these volunteers, the theatre houses a resident creative staff. This staff is responsible for conceiving, developing, and implementing the artistic vision and focus of the theatre and for major decisions about the ongoing development of the aesthetic values and activities. These include setting the season, managing the calendar, hiring directors and production staff as well as overseeing each production to make sure they are adhering to the theatre's mission & goals.

The operation costs are covered entirely by grants and donations from patrons, making every production a true instance of community theatre.  In addition to the 8-10 shows put on every year, the theatre houses a youth program for anyone aged 16 and younger. This program puts on a fully-produced and realized musical with only three weeks of preparation.

The theatre, along with other buildings in Downtown Magna, sustained visible damage during a magnitude 5.7 earthquake on the morning of March 18, 2020.

Oquirrh Hills Performing Arts Alliance 
Starting in 2006, the Oquirrh Hills Performing Arts Alliance (OHPAA) – succeeded in once again making the Empress Theatre a working theatre. Since that time, the volunteers, actors and, board members of the OHPAA have worked tirelessly to improve both the organization and the building itself in order to continue to bring quality family entertainment to this corner of the Salt Lake Valley

See also

 National Register of Historic Places listings in Salt Lake County, Utah

References

External links 

 

Theatres in Utah
National Register of Historic Places in Salt Lake County, Utah